The Kim Chol Ju University of Education is a university in Sŏn'gyo-guyŏk, Pyongyang, North Korea.

History 

The university was established on October 1, 1946, as the Pyongyang Teacher Training College (평양교원대학). It changed its name to the Pyongyang University of Education no. 1 (평양제1사범대학) in September 1972. It was renamed the Pyongyang University of Education in April 1989. It assumed its current name in October 1990.

Faculty 

 Dean of Faculty Ho Nam Chol
 Professor Kim Hyun-sik (defector)

References

External links 
 Kim Chol Ju University of Education at Naenara

1946 establishments in North Korea
Education in Pyongyang
Universities in North Korea
Educational institutions established in 1946